The first USS Courier was a storeship acquired by the Union Navy during the American Civil War. She was used by the Union Navy as a supply ship to support Union Navy ships engaged in the blockade of Southern ports. Courier also operated as a gunboat when the opportunity presented itself from time to time.

Purchased in New York City in 1861 

Courier, a storeship, was purchased 7 September 1861 from W. B. Thomas and Co., New York City, and commissioned 17 September 1861, Acting Master W. K. Cressy in command.

Service history 

Courier sailed from New York City 17 October 1861 on the first of many voyages to bring supplies to ships at Port Royal, South Carolina, along the Florida coast, and in the Gulf of Mexico as far west as New Orleans, Louisiana. Participating in the Union blockade of the Confederate States of America, Courier captured three blockade runners, Angelina and Emeline on 16 May 1863 and Maria Bishop on 17 May 1863.

Courier ran aground in the Abaco Islands in the Bahamas on 14 June 1864 and had to be abandoned, but her officers and men, together with her stores and cargo, were saved and sent to the United States.

References

External links 
 Guide to the Log of the USS Courier, 1863-1864 MS 76 held by Special Collection & Archives, Nimitz Library at the United States Naval Academy

 

Ships of the Union Navy
Gunboats of the United States Navy
American Civil War auxiliary ships of the United States
Stores ships of the United States Navy
Shipwrecks of the American Civil War
Shipwrecks of the Bahamas
Maritime incidents in June 1864